The Fall is the fourth studio album by American singer-songwriter Norah Jones, released on November 11, 2009, by Blue Note Records. The album debuted at number three on the Billboard 200, selling 180,000 copies in its first week. As of August 2012, the album had sold over three million copies worldwide.

Background and production
Before the album's release, Jones' website stated that she had taken a new direction, with new collaborators and producer  Jacquire King. King hired songwriters Ryan Adams and Will Sheff, in addition to drummers Joey Waronker, James Gadson and Marco Giovino, keyboardist James Poyser, and guitarists Marc Ribot, Smokey Hormel, Lyle Workman, and Peter Atanasoff and bassists Frank Howard Swart and Dave Wilder. The album cover was taken by photographer Autumn de Wilde.

Singles and promotion
 The first single, "Chasing Pirates", was released on October 13, 2009.
 "Young Blood" was released as the second single in North America, Europe (minus the UK), and Japan. The music video was made available at iTunes on 30 March 2010. The song has reached No. 33 on the Japan Hot 100.
 "Stuck" was released as the second single on March 5, 2010, in the UK (digital download only).
 "It's Gonna Be" was released as the third single in North America in April 2010. It charted on the Billboard Triple A Chart and peaked on the airplay chart at No. 11 in April 2010. Jones performed the song on The Ellen DeGeneres Show.

To promote the release of the album Jones appeared on:

 Dancing with the Stars – October 20, 2009
 Later with Jools Holland – November 3, 2009
 Late Show with David Letterman – November 11, 2009
 Good Morning America – November 16, 2009
 The Colbert Report – November 18, 2009
 The View – November 23, 2009
 France Inter live in Paris – December 7, 2009
 The Tonight Show with Conan O'Brien – December 15, 2009
 Jimmy Kimmel Live! – December 16, 2009
 A Prairie Home Companion – December 19, 2009
 Chelsea Lately – December 21, 2009
 13 heures February 10, 2010
 Skavlan February 12, 2010
 Q TV April 2010
 The Ellen DeGeneres Show – April 23, 2010
 Good Morning America – June 11, 2010 (with Sarah McLachlan)
 The Ellen DeGeneres Show – June 25, 2010
 The Tonight Show with Jay Leno – August 31, 2010
 The Late Late Show with Craig Ferguson – September 10, 2010
 Late Night with Jimmy Fallon – October 26, 2010

Reception

The Fall received generally positive reviews from music critics. At Metacritic, which assigns a normalized rating out of 100 to reviews from mainstream critics, the album has an average score of 73 out of 100, which indicates "generally favorable reviews" based on 22 reviews.

Billboard gave the album a score of 83 out of 100 and stated that "Jones ditches the gentle piano-playing of her previous work and rises to a new level of creative boldness." The New York Times gave it a favorable review and called it "the sonic and emotional expansion [Jones'] music needed, and it's tied to some of her most unguarded songs." Uncut gave it four stars out of five and said that "The emotional imprint... moves beyond the pining, wistful tones that are [Jones'] trademark in favor of Sex And The City scenarios bursting with heartbreak, regret and emotional devastation." Q also gave it four stars out of five and praised the album for its "copper-bottomed classics". musicOMH likewise gave it four stars out of five and said, "Less predictable was her now clear desire to take risks and step off the all-too-well-forged path of safe, agreeable background music. Instead, on The Fall Norah Jones chooses to defy categorization." Hot Press gave it a score of four out of five with the header: "Easy listening princess goes indie-goth." The Boston Globe gave it a favorable review and stated that Jones "seems liberated from the expectations of what her music is supposed to sound like, and the album is flush with fresh production ideas and a varied sonic palette."

Filter gave the album a score of 78% and stated that "unlike Not Too Late, Jones’ latest decision to ditch her keys for strings is a poor one. In a way, she has indeed found a different beat to groove to, and if anyone can play in a piano bar without a piano, it would certainly be Norah Jones." Paste gave it a score of 7.6 out of 10 and stated that "Jones is clearly comfortable with where she’s arrived, and is ready to throw open the doors for a party." Spin gave it a score of seven out of ten and said that the album "has been billed as Norah Jones' rock album. In fact, it's something even more surprising: a hot-blooded soul record from the queen of the even keel."

Other reviews are average or mixed: The Austin Chronicle gave the album three stars out of five and said it "offers many new sides to Jones while remaining comfortably close to the jazz diva many adore." Yahoo! Music UK gave it six stars out of ten and stated that "If the hardcore fanbase feel a blanch coming on, this isn't all wilful eclecticism gone mad. [Jacquire] King's work is The Fall's unifying factor that keeps it cohesive." Mojo gave it three stars out of five and said that "The wrong kind of sonic adventure undermines about half the songs." The Guardian also gave it three stars out of five and stated that "Jones's cashmere voice sounds more polite than ever, creating an overriding impression of a nice girl keeping dirty company." Under the Radar gave it five stars out of ten and called it "intelligent, tasteful, and well-executed music. But it ain't rock 'n' roll, not even a little, and damn Jones for trying to pretend that it is."

Track listing

Personnel

 Norah Jones – vocals, piano , Wurlitzer electric piano , acoustic guitar , electric guitar , tack piano , glockenspiel 
 John Kirby – synthesizer , tack piano , piano , Casio 
 James Poyser – Wurlitzer electric piano , organ 
 Matt Stanfield – programming , synthesizer 
 Zac Rae – synthesizer , Rhodes electric piano, vibraphone, marimba , organ , Marxophone , clavinet 
 Sam Cohen – electric guitar 
 Smokey Hormel – electric guitar 
 Peter Atanasoff – electric guitar 
 Sasha Dobson – acoustic guitar 
 Lyle Workman – acoustic guitar ,  electric guitar 
 Marc Ribot – electric guitar , banjo 
 Jon Graboff – pedal steel guitar 
 Frank Howard Swart – bass 
 Dave Wilder – bass 
 Gus Seyffert – bass 
 Catherine Popper – bass 
 Tony Scherr – bass 
 Marco Giovino – drums 
 Robert Di Pietro – drums 
 Pete McNeal – drums 
 Joey Waronker – drums 
 James Gadson – drums  
 Will Sayles – percussion 
 Mike Martin – backing vocals 

On Live at The Living Room

 Norah Jones – vocals, piano , Wurlitzer electric piano , electric guitar 
 Sasha Dobson – electric guitar , acoustic guitar , backing vocals
 Smokey Hormel – electric guitar
 Gus Seyffert – bass , acoustic guitar , backing vocals
 Greg Wieczorek – drums 

Production

 Jacquire King – producer, recording, mixing
 Brad Bivens – additional recording
 Brian Thorn, Morgan Stratton – recording assistants
 Tom Schick – additional production , additional engineer , mixing 
 Jon Stinson – mixing assistant 
 Stephen Clemmer, Jimi Zhivago – recording engineer 
 Steven Ha – live sound mix 
 David Schoenwetter, Chris Allen – mixing assistants 
 Greg Calbi – mastering
 Autumn de Wilde – photography
 Gordon H. Jee – creative director
 Frank Harkins – art direction, design

Charts

Weekly charts

Year-end charts

Certifications

Release history

References

2009 albums
Albums produced by Jacquire King
Blue Note Records albums
Norah Jones albums